Ebini Airport  is an airport serving the community of Ebini in the Upper Demerara-Berbice Region of Guyana.

See also

 List of airports in Guyana
 Transport in Guyana

References

External links
Google Maps - Ebini
Ebini Airport
OurAirports - Ebini

Airports in Guyana